Jacobus Conradus "Beertjie" van Vuuren (born 4 September 1995) is a South African professional rugby union player for the  in Super Rugby, the  in the Currie Cup and the  in the Rugby Challenge. His regular position is tighthead prop.

Rugby career

2008–2013: Schoolboy rugby

Van Vuuren was born in Magaliesburg in Gauteng, but grew up in Mpumalanga province. He scored a try for the Pumas in the latter tournament, in a 24–40 defeat to Western Province in Polokwane. After the tournament, Van Vuuren was included in a South Africa Schools squad, and he made two appearances for them in the 2013 Under-18 International Series, coming on as a replacement in a 19–14 win over England and starting their 17–13 victory over France.

2014–2016: Free State Cheetahs and UFS Shimlas

After high school, Van Vuuren moved to Bloemfontein, where he enrolled at the University of the Free State and joined the  academy. He made a single appearance for the  team during the 2014 Under-19 Provincial Championship, coming on as a replacement in their match against .

He was promoted to the starting line-up for their final match of the regular season against , as UFS finished in second place on the log. He remained in the starting line-up for their 21–10 victory over defending champions  in the semi-final, and for the final, in which the Shimlas beat the  63–33 to win the competition for the first time.

Van Vuuren was a regular for the  team during the 2015 Under-21 Provincial Championship, appearing in thirteen of their fourteen matches, making five starts.

Van Vuuren made three appearances off the bench in UFS Shimlas' 2016 Varsity Cup season, with a nine-point try in their Round Two match against  proving decisive in a 47–46 win. It was a disappointing season for the defending champions, as they failed to qualify for the semi-finals, finishing in fifth place.

Van Vuuren came on in the 62nd minute of the match to make his first class debut, helping his team to a 55–17 victory. He was also named on the bench for the final, and again finished on the winning side, with the Free State Cheetahs beating the  36–16 to win the title for the fifth time in their history and the first time since 2007.

2017–present: Bulls and Blue Bulls

Van Vuuren moved to Pretoria-based  prior to the 2017 season on a two-year deal.

References

South African rugby union players
Living people
1995 births
People from Mogale City Local Municipality
Rugby union props
Free State Cheetahs players
Rugby union players from Gauteng
Sunwolves players
Bulls (rugby union) players
Blue Bulls players
Cheetahs (rugby union) players